In spherical trigonometry, the half side formula relates the angles and lengths of the sides of spherical triangles, which are triangles drawn on the surface of a sphere and so have curved sides and do not obey the formulas for plane triangles.

Formulas
On a unit sphere, the half-side formulas are
 

where 
 a, b, c are the lengths of the sides respectively opposite angles A, B, C,
   is half the sum of the angles, and
 

The three formulas are really the same formula, with the names of the variables permuted.

To generalize to a sphere of arbitrary radius r, the lengths a,b,c must be replaced with
 
 
 
so that a,b,c all have length scales, instead of angular scales.

See also 
 Spherical law of cosines
 Law of haversines

References

Spherical trigonometry